Remote laboratory (also known as online laboratory or remote workbench) is the use of telecommunications to remotely conduct real (as opposed to virtual) experiments, at the physical location of the operating technology, whilst the scientist is utilizing technology from a separate geographical location. Remote laboratory comprehends one or more remote experiments.

Benefits
The benefits of remote laboratories are predominantly in engineering education:
 Relax time constraints, adapting to pace of each student, if there was insufficient time in lab
 Relax geographical constraints, disregarding the physical locality of the student
 Economies of scale, as sharing labs allows sharing of large fixed costs of traditional buildings
 Improve quality of experiment, as it can be repeated to clarify doubtful measurements in lab
 Improve effectiveness, as student may improve effectiveness of time spent at lab by rehearsal
 Improved safety and security, as no risk of catastrophic failure

Researchers from the Labshare describe the advantages as being:
 Increasing accessibility to laboratories by a factor of 4 within 3 years, since current lab utilization is less than 10%
 Decrease fixed and variable expenditure by 50%, since faculty budget spends between 15 and 40% on lab infrastructure and personnel, around $400m per year
 Improve learning objectives and outcomes to support better learning
 Enhance sharing of knowledge, expertise and experience
 Reduce start-up costs of laboratories

This allows for economies of scale production.

Another benefit is that this technology can be integrated into Moodle, which is probably the most used Learning Management System around the world.

Disadvantages
The disadvantages differ depending on the type of remote laboratory and the topic area.
The general disadvantages compared to a proximal (hands on) laboratory are:
 Lack of hands on trouble shooting and debugging experience.
 Lack of equipment setup experience.

Future direction
Current system capabilities include:
 Online session booking, utilizing a database and online interface
 Authentication to satisfy security requirements
 Desktop, generalized screen for chat, emoticon, time limit, bandwidth limit
 Live lab camera which allows panning, tilting, zooming, showing, hiding, refresh
 Circuit builder (this is just simulative)
 Function generator (this is just simulative)
 Digital multimeter (this is just simulative)
 Oscilloscope (this is just simulative)

See also
GOLC
iLabs
Labicom
Lila Project
FARLabs

References

External links
Edrys
Remote Electronic eXtensions
Smart Adaptive Remote Laboratory SARL
Labwork
Remote Laboratory, The Hong Kong Polytechnic University
FARLabs
Labicom 
Netlab from the University of South Australia
LabsLand: global network of remote laboratories
Labshare 
Labster 
MIT iCampus iLabs from Massachusetts Institute of Technology and wiki
netCIRCUITlabs
Remote Labs from the University of Technology Sydney
Remotely controlled lab from the Palacký University of Olomouc
iLabs from the University of Queensland
iSES internet School Experiment System
LiLa project - Library of Labs
Online-Lab, Carinthia
UWA Telerobot
WebLab, University of Deusto
iLough-Lab, University of Loughborough
Remote Engineering and Virtual Instrumentation
International Journal of Online Engineering
Free Open Online Labs
Remote Operation of Engineering Labs - University of Tennessee at Chattanooga
Remote Internet Lab GymKT (the Grammar-school of J. Vrchlicky), Klatovy
VISIR (Virtual Instrument Systems In Reality) - Blekinge Institute of Technology
Remote Experimentation Lab - RExLab from the Federal University of Santa Catarina
Remote Labs Learning Environment - RELLE
University Network of Interactive Labs Spanish Open University
Moodle EJSApp and Extensions Set for Virtual and Remote Laboratories
R-DSP Lab, University of Patras
Remotely Controlled Laboratory, University of Technology Kaiserslautern
Robotic DistanceLab
Internet microscope/Magnetic domain investigate, Physics Faculty, University at Białystok,Poland, since 1999
Social Proton

Laboratory types